Ponnu is a 1987 Indian Malayalam film, directed by P. G. Vishwambharan and produced by Royal Achankunju. The film stars Jagathy Sreekumar, Innocent, Thilakan and Ashokan. The film's score was composed by Ouseppachan.

Cast
Jagathy Sreekumar
Innocent
Thilakan
Ashokan
Bhagyalakshmi
Vineeth
Sithara
Kalaranjini
Shari
Thanuja
Jayalalitha

Soundtrack
The music was composed by Ouseppachan with lyrics by P. Bhaskaran.

References

External links
 
 Ponnu on Moviebuff

1987 films
1980s Malayalam-language films
Films directed by P. G. Viswambharan
Films scored by Ouseppachan